In the early morning hours of 6 December 2017, militants believed to be affiliated with the Islamic State in West Africa attacked a patrol of US Army Special Forces and Nigerien soldiers near Diffa, in the Lake Chad Basin Region in Niger.  During the ensuing firefight, Nigerien and American personnel suffered no casualties while 11 militants, including two wearing suicide vests, were killed. An enemy weapons cache was also destroyed by the joint US/Nigerien force. The firefight was not planned as the purpose of the mission was aimed at setting "the conditions for future partner-led operations against violent extremist organizations in the region".

The attack came a little over two months after the deadly ambush in the village of Tongo Tongo that left at least 30 dead including four American Special Forces personnel. The December firefight was not initially reported and only learned three months later after a declassified report made for Congress was obtained by The New York Times. The firefight is just one of 10 other incidents involving American personal in Niger. During these previous firefights, excluding the ambush that happened two months earlier, only a few enemy combatants were killed while no Americans or Nigeriens were hurt. 

This event and, most prominently, the October ambush led to security changes for US forces operating in the region such as armored vehicles instead of lightly armored SUV's, the arming of drones, and taking a closer look at when US forces conduct operations with local troops.

References 

December 2017 events in Africa
Historical events in Niger